Subang Jaya City Council (MBSJ; Malay: Majlis Bandaraya Subang Jaya) is the city council which is in charge of the Subang Jaya city and the southern parts of Petaling district. This agency is under Selangor state government of Malaysia. MBSJ are responsible for the public's health and sanitation, waste removal and management, town planning, environmental protection and building control, social and economic development and general maintenance functions of urban infrastructure. The MBSJ headquarters is located in UEP Subang Jaya.

History 

In the 1970s the Selangor state government established the Petaling District Council (Majlis Daerah Petaling, MDP) under section 4 of the Local Government Act 1976. In 1994, the state government decided to upgrade the authority to the status of a municipal council (majlis perbandaran), and rename it the Subang Jaya Municipal Council. The Subang Jaya Municipal Council was formed on 1 January 1997, by combining the existing Petaling District Council with several areas ceded from the Petaling Jaya Municipal Council (MPPJ) and Shah Alam Municipal Council (MPSA).

In December 2019, the Subang Jaya Municipal Council was granted the approval from the federal government to elevate its status from a City Council to become Subang Jaya City Council (MBSJ), which was gazetted on 20 October 2020.

Organisation chart

Presidents and Mayors

Current appointed councillors

2021/2022 Session

 Original councilor Nor Liyana Yahaya from PKR died in term.

Departments 
 Top Management
 Service Management Department
 Corporate Planning & Strategic Management Department
 Treasury Department
 Revenue Department
 Town Planning Department
 Valuation & Property Management Department
 Legal Department
 License Department
 Landscape Department
 Enforcement Department
 Building Department
 Engineering Department
 Health Department
 Community Development Department
 Solid Waste And Public Cleansing Management Department
 Information Technology Department
 Commissioner Of Building Department
 One Stop Centre Department
 Internal Audit Department
 Quantity Surveying And Contract Department
 Integrity Unit

Administrate area
In parliamentary terms, MBSJ administrative area covers the parliamentary constituency of Puchong and Subang in its entirety, as well as parts of Kota Raja which mainly cover USJ 23-27, Putra Heights and Kampung Bukit Lanchong. Subang Jaya city itself, most part of USJ (USJ 1-22), Kinrara, and northern part of Puchong lies within the Subang constituency, while Seri Kembangan, and southern part of Puchong falls within the Puchong constituency.

The gazetted decision defined the authority's area of 16,180 hectares and divided it into seven Planning Blocks in accordance with the Subang Jaya Municipal Council Local Plan 2035 (RTMPSJ 2035):

 Planning Block 1 - Subang Jaya (SS 12 - SS 19), Bandar Sunway (PJS 7/PJS 9/PJS 11) & UEP Subang Jaya (USJ 1 - USJ 22); 
 Planning Block 2 - USJ 3A, Tropicana Metropark, Subang Hi-Tech & Batu Tiga; 
 Planning Block 3 - UEP Subang Jaya (USJ 23 - USJ 28), Putra Heights, Kampung Batu 13 1/2, Kampung Tengah, Kampung Bukit Lanchong; 
 Planning Block 4 - Kinrara, Bandar Puchong Jaya; 
 Planning Block 5 - Pusat Bandar Puchong, Bandar Puteri, Puchong Perdana, Puchong Utama, Batu 14, Puchong Hartamas, Kampung Baru Puchong, Bandar Bukit Puchong; 
 Planning Block 6 - Putra Permai, Equine Park, Saujana Puchong, Puncak Jalil, Lestari Perdana, Lestari Putra, Pinggiran Putra, Universiti Putra Malaysia (UPM) and 
 Planning Block 7 - Seri Kembangan New Village, Bukit Serdang, Universiti Indah, Serdang Jaya, Sri Serdang, Serdang Raya, Serdang Perdana, Serdang Lama, The Mines, Sungai Besi Indah, Belimbing Indah

Apart from this, the administration area for MBSJ was further breakdown into 24 zones.

Offices
UEP Subang Jaya (Headquarters)
Puteri Puchong
Serdang Jaya

Gallery

References

External links 

MBSJ official web site

1997 establishments in Malaysia
Subang Jaya
Subang Jaya
City councils in Malaysia